Balgarene refers to the following places in Bulgaria:

 Balgarene, Lovech Province
 Balgarene, Pleven Province
 Balgarene, Stara Zagora Province